Paul Heroux (born 1976) is an American politician who is the Sheriff of Bristol County, Massachusetts. He previously served as Mayor of Attleboro, Massachusetts, and a State Representative from the Second Bristol District, elected in 2012.

Career

State Representative
Heroux served as a state representative from 2013-2017.

Electoral History
Paul Heroux was first elected in November 2012 as the State Representative from the Second Bristol District, Massachusetts. 
 On 6 September 2012, Heroux won a Democratic primary with over 78% of the vote. 
 On 7 November 2012, Heroux defeated Republican incumbent George T. Ross with over 58% of the vote. Representative-elect Heroux was sworn in as freshmen representative on 2 January 2013. 
 On 4 November 2014 Heroux was elected to a second term with 61% of the vote over local businessman Bert Buckley. 
 In 2016, Heroux ran unopposed for reelection and received 99.6% of the total votes cast for state representative.

Issues
Heroux's work as a state representative included creating a $38 million school internet infrastructure grant program that offered money to school districts all over Massachusetts, was a cosponsor of the transgender public accommodation bill, which is now law as the Massachusetts Gender Identity Anti-Discrimination Initiative, was a cosponsor of the ban on gay conversion therapy, which is now law, adding money to several state budgets for homeless children's programs, and fought to try to get the state to measure prison program outcomes on reducing recidivism.

Mayor
Paul Heroux served as mayor of Attleboro, MA for five years from January 2, 2018 until January 3, 2023.

Electoral History
 On 19 September 2017, Heroux came in first in a mayoral preliminary with 46.5% against 7-term incumbent Kevin Dumas, handing Dumas his first political defeat with 41.5%, and 12% for former fire chief Ronald Churchill.
 On 7 November 2017, Heroux defeated 7-term incumbent Kevin Dumas with 54% of the vote. 
 On 5 November 2019, Heroux defeated Republican challenger and city council vice president Heather Porreca 67% to 32% for the race for mayor.
 On 2 November 2021, Heroux won 66% of the vote against his opponent Todd McGhee winning a third and final term as mayor.

Issues
As mayor, Heroux has pushed the redevelopment of the city center, prioritized business support, prioritized education spending by repairing roofs that leaked for 20 years, boosted education funding and created a special education stabilization fund, maintained the city's AA bond rating despite hard financial times inflicted by the COVID-19 pandemic. Heroux created a rent and mortgage assistance program for Attleboro residents who fell behind on rent and mortgage payments to help avoid evictions and foreclosures. Heroux has made efforts to recruit women and people of color fill vacancies on city boards and commissions. Heroux promoted advanced training in unconscious bias, duty to intervene to prevent excessive force, and de-escalation training for city police officers, and made sure that every firefighter has two sets of protective fire gear for the first time in city department history by funding in the budget every year. Heroux made news across the country when he implemented a strict zero tolerance policy for people who leave dogs in hot cars,

The Sun Chronicle said "Paul Heroux will surely go down as the most environmentally-conscience mayor in Attleboro’s history." During Heroux's tenure as mayor, he has taken many decidedly pro-environmental positions. These include purchasing the bankrupt privately owned Highland Country Club and turning it into the city owned Highland Park and putting a monarch butterfly population in the new park, making all city government buildings 100% wind powered, ordered city workers to use recycled paper products whenever practicable and cost effective, formed a special committee to update the city's Natural Hazards Mitigation Plan and Municipal Vulnerability Preparedness Report to prepare for the possibility of greater impact from climate change, changing all of the city street lights and city building lights to LED lights, moving the city fleet of vehicles to hybrids where possible, putting solar panels above city owned parking lots, making Attleboro a Green Community, banning single use plastic bags,  banning plastic and Styrofoam take away cups and containers from restaurants and convenience stores, banning body and face washes that have plastic exfoliating beads, banning the intentional releasing of balloons into the air, banning the distribution of plastic straws, the sale of fluorescent light bulbs containing mercury and bee killing insecticides containing neonicotinoids. Heroux also submitted ordinance proposals that would triple the Wetland Protection Zone, and ban single use plastic water bottles, and plastic miniature alcohol bottles.  Heroux is also seen around the city picking up litter with his dog or with groups of volunteers.

In 2017, on the day of the preliminary election, Heroux was featured by several media outlets for being bitten by a dog the day before while campaigning for mayor, his sixth dog bite in 5 years.

Sheriff

On 10 January 2022, Heroux announced he is running for Sheriff of Bristol County, Massachusetts against incumbent Sheriff Thomas M. Hodgson.
 Heroux won the Democratic primary on September 6 with 41.8% of the vote, while the other two candidates received 33.5% and 24.7%.
 Heroux defeated Hodgson in the general election on November 8, 2022 with 50.9% to 49.1%.

Heroux took office on 4 January 2023. Heroux started new recruitment and retention incentives, hired an expert to review inmate suicides, and offered a plan to close the Ash Street jail, which is the oldest jail in operation in the country.

Personal life
Heroux was raised in Attleboro to small business drug store owners. He was awarded the 'Most Genuine' class superlative from his 1995 high school class for a complete abstinence to alcohol and drugs. Heroux holds two Ivy League master's degrees; one from Harvard University, a master's in Public Administration, and the other from the University of Pennsylvania, a master of science in Criminology, respectively, a master of science in International Relations from the London School of Economics, and a bachelor's degree in Psychology and Neuroscience from the University of Southern California. In 2017, Heroux published a book on US foreign policy in the Middle East, has lived in Saudi Arabia, and has been to North Korea.

Prior to elected office, Heroux worked in the Philadelphia jail system, as the director of research in the Massachusetts prison system, for the national security think-tank Institute for Defense and Disarmament Studies, as an English teacher in Saudi Arabia, and with kids for seven years at a YMCA. Heroux, after earning instructor level ranks, also taught Jeet Kune Do, Filipino Kali, and Jiu Jitsu at a studio he opened at 19 years old.

From October to November 2018, Heroux took a 12-day,  road trip across 24 states and Canada with his dog Mura, posting pictures on his Facebook page. The trip went viral after being picked up by news outlets across the United States and in dozens of countries.

References

External links

Members of the Massachusetts House of Representatives
Mayors of places in Massachusetts
Politicians from Taunton, Massachusetts
1976 births
Living people
Harvard Kennedy School alumni
University of Southern California alumni
University of Pennsylvania alumni
Alumni of the London School of Economics
21st-century American politicians